Nasser Masoud (Arabic:ناصر مسعود) (born 6 March 1986) is an Emirati footballer who plays as a winger.

External links

References

Emirati footballers
1986 births
Living people
Al Jazira Club players
Al Shabab Al Arabi Club Dubai players
Al Dhaid SC players
Footballers at the 2006 Asian Games
UAE Pro League players
UAE First Division League players
Association football wingers
Asian Games competitors for the United Arab Emirates